The Six Goswamis of Vrindavan were a group of devotional teachers (gurus) from the Gaudiya Vaishnava tradition of Hinduism who lived in India during the 15th and 16th centuries. They are closely associated with the land of Vrindavan where they spent much time in service of Sri Chaitanya Mahaprabhu, who is considered as Krishna's yuga-avatar by the Gaudiya Vaishnava lineage, who highly regard them for their extreme renunciation of physical comforts and pleasures in the practice of Bhakti Yoga, and for their philosophical presentations of the teachings of their guru, Chaitanya Mahaprabhu.

Vrindavan

Apart from producing a prolific amount of writings regarding Vaishnava philosophy and practices, the Six Goswamis also dedicated a significant amount of their time to uncovering many ancient and sacred areas of land in Vrindavan associated with Radha, Krishna and the Gopis. These sections of land are the sites wherein Radha and Krishna performed specific lilas during the previous yuga in accordance to the events recorded in the Bhagavata Purana. Although having little in the way of financial possessions themselves, the Goswamis inspired the building of a number of large and ornate temples on and around these sites (dedicated to the worship of Radha and Krishna); which play a role in Vrindavan society to this day.

Members

The six members of the group were: 
 The brothers Rupa Goswami and Sanatana Goswami 
 Jiva Goswami (nephew of Rupa and Sanatana).
 Raghunatha Bhatta Goswami
 Gopala Bhatta Goswami
 Raghunatha dasa Goswami

See also
Gaudiya Mission
Gaudiya Math
Hare Krishna
International Society for Krishna Consciousness
Krishna
Nityananda
Chaitanya Mahaprabhu

References
 Six Goswamis of Vrindavan, by Steven Rosen, Folk Books, 1991.

External links
 Six Goswamis of Vrindavan
 Six Goswamis - Chronology
 Sad-goswamy-astaka ("Eight Prayers to the Six Goswamis") by Srinivasa Acharya - text
 Sad-goswamy-astaka, sung by Jaya Gurudeva dasa, MP3
 Sad-goswamy-astaka, mixed choir video clip by Syamasundara dasa

Medieval Hindu religious leaders
16th-century Hindu religious leaders
Gaudiya religious leaders
Vrindavan